

Canadian football news in 1912
The Regina Rugby Club adopted red and black as their jersey colours, one explanation being that these were the colours of the (supposed) Canadian contingent with Teddy Roosevelt's Rough Riders in the Spanish–American War.

The Hamilton Alerts were suspended by the ORFU on November 23 for flaunting the authority of the Union. The Toronto Rowing and Athletic Club had protested a penalty call which had resulted in a victory for the Alerts. The ORFU ordered the game be re-played on the 23rd, but the Alerts refused to field a full team. The Alerts lost to Toronto, 39–7, while the main squad lost a regularly scheduled match in Hamilton to the Tigers, 12–8. The Alerts went on to defeat the Toronto Argonauts, 11–4, in the Grey Cup game. Many of the players joined the Tigers of IRFU the following season.

McGill University ended Varsity's reign as Grey Cup champions in 1912, but refused to challenge for the trophy because the students didn't want to take time away from their studies.

Regular season

Final regular season standings
Note: GP = Games Played, W = Wins, L = Losses, T = Ties, PF = Points For, PA = Points Against, Pts = Points
*Bold text means that they have clinched the playoffs

* Calgary Tigers awarded first place based on 20-16 score in head-to-head games

League Champions

Grey Cup playoffs
Note: All dates in 1912

Western semifinal

Western Final - SRFU–MRFU Inter-League Playoff

ORFU Playoff

Hamilton advances to the Grey Cup.

East final

Toronto Argonauts advance to the Grey Cup.

Playoff bracket

Grey Cup Championship

References

 
Canadian Football League seasons